Hirasawa (written: 平澤 or 平沢) is a Japanese surname. Notable people with the surname include:

, Japanese alpine skier
, Japanese politician
Maia Hirasawa (born 1980), Swedish singer-songwriter
Nako Hirasawa, Japanese Paralympic archer
, Japanese astronomer
, Japanese professional wrestler
, Japanese pornographic actress
, Japanese tempera painter
, Japanese footballer
, Japanese progressive-electronic musician and composer

Fictional characters
, character in the anime series Higashi no Eden
, character in the manga series K-On!
, character in the manga series K-On!

Places 
 Kiso-Hirasawa station, station in Shiojiri, Japan

See also 
 Pyongtaek, South Korea, written as 平澤 in Hanja
Japanese-language surnames